Labyorteaux is a French surname that may refer to:

Matthew Labyorteaux (born 1966), American film and television actor and voice artist 
Patrick Labyorteaux (born 1965), American actor, television producer and television writer, brother of Matthew

French-language surnames